In Thought is the debut album by the Australian progressive metal band Vanishing Point.

Track listing
 "The Only One" − 4:07
 "Vanishing Point" − 5:54
 "Wind" (Instrumental) − 0:46	
 "In Company of Darkness" − 6:57
 "Dream Maker" − 5:10
 "Sunlit Windows" − 4:46
 "Blind" − 4:15
 "Forgotten Self" − 5:46
 "A Memory" − 8:10
 "Inner Peace" −3:25

Credits

Band members
 Joe Del Mastro − bass
 Jack Lukic − drums
 Silvio Massaro − vocals
 Andrew Whitehead  − guitar
 Tom Vucur − guitar

Guest musicians
 Pep Sammartino − Guitar, Keyboards, backing vocals
 Jamie Schultz - Guitars (acoustic) (Track 2)

Production and other arrangements
 Andrew Blobel: Photography
 Adam Dempsey: Editing
 Endel Rivers: Producer, Engineer, Mastering, Mixing
 Jamie Schultz: Assistant Engineer
 Steve Smart: Mastering
 Nathan Smith: Graphic Design, Cover Design
 Vanishing Point: Producer
 Scott McMahon: Graphic Design
 Tom Mikulik: Graphic Design, Cover Design
 MJM: Mastering
 Anthony Pell: Assistant Engineer

1997 albums
Vanishing Point (band) albums